AI for Good is a year-round digital platform of the United Nations, where AI innovators and problem owners learn, discuss and connect to identify practical AI solutions to advance the UN SDGs. The impetus for organizing global summits that are action oriented, came from existing discourse in artificial intelligence (AI) research being dominated by research streams such as the Netflix Prize (improve the movie recommendation algorithm). AI for Good aims to bring forward Artificial Intelligence research topics that contribute towards more global problems, in particular through the Sustainable Development Goals. AI for Good came out of the AI for Good Global Summit 2020 which had been moved online in 2020 due to the COVID-19 Pandemic. AI for Good is organized by the Standardization Sector of ITU (ITU-T). Since moving online, AI for Good developed into three main program streams: Learn, Build, and Connect. AI for Good also helps organize ITU's Global Standards Symposium.

Online Platform 
In 2020 the Global Summit was moved to online. In 2022 this as moved the "Neural Network" platform. Speakers include:

Trustworthy AI 
Together with ITU-T Study Group 16 and 17, AI for Good has been developing technology specifications under Trustworthy AI. Including items on homomorphic encryption, secure multi-party computation, and federated learning.

Global Summit 2019 
The third AI for Good Global Summit took place from 28 May to 31 May, and gave rise to the ITU Focus Group on Artificial Intelligence for Autonomous and Assisted Driving with several Day 0 workshops and VIP events having taken place on May 27. Some of the speakers included:

Global Summit 2018 

The second AI for Good Global Summit took place from 15 to 17 May 2018 at the ITU headquarters in Geneva, Switzerland and generated 35 AI project proposals including the ITU-WHO Focus Group on Artificial Intelligence for Health with the World Health Organization. Speakers included:

The ITU also relaunched its Journal ICT Discoveries during the 2018 Global Summit, with the first edition being a special on Artificial Intelligence.

Global Summit 2017 

The first AI for Good Global summit took place from 7 to 9 June 2017. Speakers at the event included:

One of the outcomes of the 2017 Global Summit was the creation of an ITU-T Focus Group on Machine Learning for 5G.

References

External links 
 Official website

Technology conferences
Business conferences
Artificial intelligence conferences
United Nations conferences
Switzerland and the United Nations